The ITF Women's Circuit is the second tier tour for women's professional tennis organised by the International Tennis Federation, and is the tier below the WTA Tour. In 2005, the ITF Women's Circuit included tournaments with prize money ranging from $10,000 to $75,000.

The ITF world champions in 2005 were Kim Clijsters (senior singles), Lisa Raymond / Samantha Stosur (senior doubles) and Victoria Azarenka (combined junior ranking).

Tournament breakdown by region

*Includes data for Central America and the Caribbean.

Singles titles by nationThis list displays only the top 22 nations in terms of singles titles wins.''

Sources
List of ITF World Champions
ITF prize money (1983–2008) 
ITF Pro Circuit Titles Won By Nations Players in 2005

References

External links
International Tennis Federation (ITF) official website

 
ITF Women's World Tennis Tour
ITF Circuit
2005 in women's tennis